Elevated Road Amritsar  is a 4.5 km long, elevated expressway located in Amritsar, Punjab. It connects Bhandari bridge in the city to canal road near the mall of Amritsar. It also serves as a corridor for Metrobus Amritsar. Metrobus stations were also built along with elevators at major junctions of Bus Stand and Guru Ramdas Dental Hospital. There is also a future plan to extend the corridor till Guru Nanak Dev University. The road was built at a cost of Rs. 350 crores. The entire stretch is built on single-pier pillars. The road also connects commuters to Canal road and Amritsar junction railway.

References 

State Highways in Punjab, India
Roads in Punjab, India
Amritsar